Ícaro Miguel Martins Soares (born April 29, 1995) is a Brazilian taekwondo athlete who won a silver medal at the 2019 World Taekwondo Championships on the men's heavyweights.

He represented Brazil at the 2020 Summer Olympics.

References

External links

Living people
1995 births
Brazilian male taekwondo practitioners
Pan American Games medalists in taekwondo
Pan American Games silver medalists for Brazil
Taekwondo practitioners at the 2019 Pan American Games
World Taekwondo Championships medalists
Pan American Taekwondo Championships medalists
Medalists at the 2019 Pan American Games
Taekwondo practitioners at the 2020 Summer Olympics
Sportspeople from Belo Horizonte
Olympic taekwondo practitioners of Brazil
21st-century Brazilian people